Krummer Woklow is a lake in Mecklenburgische Seenplatte, Mecklenburgische Seenplatte, Mecklenburg-Vorpommern, Germany. At an elevation of 60.5 m, its surface area is 0.42 km².

Lakes of Mecklenburg-Western Pomerania